The Scout and Guide movement in Antigua and Barbuda is served by
 Antigua and Barbuda Scout Association, member of the World Organization of the Scout Movement
 The Girl Guides Association of Antigua and Barbuda, member of the World Association of Girl Guides and Girl Scouts.